WWPN (101.1 FM, "Spirit 101") is a Contemporary Christian formatted broadcast radio station licensed to Westernport, Maryland, serving Western Maryland and the Potomac Highlands of West Virginia.  WWPN is owned and operated by Santmyire Broadcasting.

History
In November 2009, WWPN added a translator, W300BU, to the Keyser, West Virginia area.

Translator

External links 
 Spirit 101 Online
 

WPN (FM)
Contemporary Christian radio stations in the United States
WPN
Radio stations established in 1988
1988 establishments in Maryland
Religion in Cumberland, MD-WV-PA